Kurszán (died 904), was a kende of the Magyars in the dual leadership with Árpád serving as a gyula - according to a mainstream theory. While kende probably corresponded roughly to the Khazar title khagan, Kurszán's role equated to the Khazar military title bek. In Latin sources he was referred to as rex and some scholars say he had a political status as a sacred king until he was massacred in a political plot of Western rulers and was temporarily succeeded by Árpád.

Hungarian conquest
He had a crucial role in the Hungarian Conquest (Honfoglalás). In 892/893 together with Arnulf of Carinthia he attacked Great Moravia to secure the eastern borders of the Frankish Empire. Arnulf gave him  all the captured lands in Moravia. Kurszán also occupied the southern part of Hungary that had belonged to the Bulgarian Kingdom. He entered into an alliance with the Byzantine emperor Leo VI after realizing the country's vulnerability from the south. Together they surprisingly defeated the army of Simeon I of Bulgaria.

In the summer of 904 Louis the Child invited Kurszán and his entourage to negotiate at the river Fischa. All were murdered there. From this point Árpád became the only ruler and occupied some of the territory of his former partner. The Kurszán family settled near Óbuda where they built Kurszánvára (meaning Castle of Kurszán). After Kurszán's death, they lived under the name Kartal.

There are toponymic traces of Kurszán on the right side of the Danube.

See also
Harka, a judicial role in Hungarian federation
List of Hungarian rulers

References

Sources 
Sándor Katona: Árpád (Koronás Kerecsen Publishing Co., 2007)

|-

Magyar tribal chieftains
904 deaths
Year of birth missing
Murdered royalty
9th-century Hungarian people
10th-century Hungarian people